In computing, remote direct memory access (RDMA) is a direct memory access from the memory of one computer into that of another without involving either one's operating system. This permits high-throughput, low-latency networking, which is especially useful in massively parallel computer clusters.

Overview 
RDMA supports zero-copy networking by enabling the network adapter to transfer data from the wire directly to application memory or from application memory directly to the wire, eliminating the need to copy data between application memory and the data buffers in the operating system. Such transfers require no work to be done by CPUs, caches, or context switches, and transfers continue in parallel with other system operations. This reduces latency in message transfer.

However, this strategy presents several problems related to the fact that the target node is not notified of the completion of the request (single-sided communications).

Acceptance 
As of 2018 RDMA had achieved broader acceptance as a result of implementation enhancements that enable good performance over ordinary networking infrastructure. For example RDMA over Converged Ethernet (RoCE) now is able to run over either lossy or lossless infrastructure. In addition iWARP enables an Ethernet RDMA implementation at the physical layer using TCP/IP as the transport, combining the performance and latency advantages of RDMA with a low-cost, standards-based solution.  The RDMA Consortium and the DAT Collaborative have played key roles in the development of RDMA protocols and APIs for consideration by standards groups such as the Internet Engineering Task Force and the Interconnect Software Consortium.

Hardware vendors have started working on higher-capacity RDMA-based network adapters, with rates of 100 Gbit/s reported. Software vendors, such as IBM, Red Hat and Oracle Corporation, support these APIs in their latest products, and  engineers have started developing network adapters that implement RDMA over Ethernet. 
Both Red Hat Enterprise Linux and Red Hat Enterprise MRG have support for RDMA. Microsoft supports RDMA in Windows Server 2012 via SMB Direct. VMware's ESXi product also supports RDMA as of 2015.

Common RDMA implementations include the Virtual Interface Architecture, RDMA over Converged Ethernet (RoCE), InfiniBand, Omni-Path and iWARP.

References

External links 
 RDMA Consortium
 : A Remote Direct Memory Access Protocol Specification
 A Tutorial of the RDMA Model
 "Why Compromise?" // HPCwire, Gilad Shainer (Mellanox Technologies), 2006
 A Critique of RDMA for high-performance computing
 RDMA Reads: To Use or Not to Use?
 

Computer memory
Operating system technology
Local area networks